Pycnosteus is an extinct genus of jawless fish from the Devonian. It is thought to have cruised through vegetation, eating small invertebrates which it knocked loose .

Sources 

 Fishes of the World by Joseph S. Nelson
 Vertebrate Fossils and the Evolution of Scientific Concepts by W. Sargeant

Devonian jawless fish
Heterostraci genera
Devonian fish of Europe
Fossils of Russia